Wallace "Chip" Gregson (born March 31, 1946) is a former U.S. official and marine who writes on U.S. foreign policy issues in various publications. He served as assistant defense secretary for Asian and Pacific Security Affairs from 2009 until 2011 during Barack Obama's presidency. In 2003, President George W. Bush  nominated him to be the top marine commander of the Pacific. He was the top U.S. general in Okinawa, Japan.

Gregson is a 1964 graduate of the Valley Forge Military Academy and a 1968 graduate of the United States Naval Academy.

References

Living people
Valley Forge Military Academy and College alumni
United States Naval Academy alumni
United States Marines
United States Marine Corps generals
United States Assistant Secretaries of Defense
1946 births